Brochoneura is a genus of plants in family Myristicaceae.

Species
Species include:
 Brochoneura acuminata (Lam.) Warb.
 Brochoneura chapelieri (Baill.) H.Perrier
 Brochoneura dardainii Heckel
 Brochoneura humblotii H.Perrier
 Brochoneura rarabe H.Perrier

Formerly placed here
 Cephalosphaera usambarensis (as Brochoneura usambarensis)

References

External links

Myristicaceae genera
Endemic flora of Madagascar